Komedianti is a 1954 Czech film directed by Vladimír Vlček. It was entered into the 1954 Cannes Film Festival.

Cast
 Jaroslav Vojta - Starý komediant
 Ladislav Pešek - Zak
 Jaroslav Mareš - Fricek
 Alena Martinovská - Olga
 Marie Vásová - Reditelka cirkusu
 Gabriela Bártlová
 Svatopluk Beneš - Bohatý pán
 František Filipovský - Rychtár
 Josef Hlinomaz - Cop
 Rudolf Hrušínský - Havránek
 Vera Kalendová - Rychtárka
 František Klika - Cop
 Marie Nováková - Kalupinka
 Theodor Pištěk - Hospodský
 Josef Príhoda - Spectator in the Pub
 Libuše Zemková - Margit

References

External links
 

1954 films
Czechoslovak drama films
1950s Czech-language films
Czech drama films
1954 drama films
1950s Czech films